Jason Canela (born April 25, 1992) is an American actor of Cuban descent, best known for his roles in telenovelas. He has appeared in serials such as ¿Dónde Está Elisa? and Cosita Linda. Canela made his English-language television debut in 2016. He is the younger brother of actor-singer Jencarlos Canela. In January 2018, Soap Opera Digest announced he had been cast in the role of Arturo Rosales on The Young and the Restless. After exiting the soap on contract status, Canela returned for a few special events. The most recent planned, according to Soap Dirt, is for his character Arturo's appearance at the wedding of his brother, Rey Rosales (Jordi Vilasuso).

Early life and education
Canela was born in Miami, Florida, to Cuban parents Lisette and Heriberto Canela. He has three older siblings, including actor-singer Jencarlos Canela. Canela studied acting at The Lee Strasberg Theatre & Film Institute in New York City.

Series

Television

References

External links
 

1992 births
Living people
American male telenovela actors
Hispanic and Latino American male actors
American people of Cuban descent
American male soap opera actors
Male actors from Miami